Jozef Vajs (born 20 August 1997), is a Slovak professional footballer who plays for Austrian club SC Lassee as a midfielder.

Club career
Vajs made his professional Fortuna Liga debut for Zemplín Michalovce against Ružomberok on 27 August 2016. Vajs replaced Adrián Leško in the 62nd minute and was booked with a yellow card a minute later.

References

External links
 MFK Zemplín Michalovce official club profile
 Futbalnet profile
 
 Jozef Vajs at ÖFB

1997 births
Living people
Slovak footballers
Slovak expatriate footballers
Association football midfielders
MFK Zemplín Michalovce players
FK Slavoj Trebišov players
Slovak Super Liga players
2. Liga (Slovakia) players
Sportspeople from Humenné
Slovak expatriate sportspeople in Austria
Expatriate footballers in Austria